The 2015 Clemson Tigers women's soccer team represented Clemson University during the 2015 NCAA Division I women's soccer season.  The Tigers were led by head coach Ed Radwanski, in his fifth season.  They played home games at Riggs Field.  Riggs Field celebrated its 100th anniversary this year, in October.

Roster

Updated November 13, 2015

Schedule

|-
!colspan=6 style=""| Regular season

|-
!colspan=6 style=""| ACC Tournament

|-
!colspan=6 style=""| NCAA Tournament

References

External links

Clemson
Clemson women's soccer
Clemson
Clemson Tigers women's soccer seasons